The Saudi-Egyptian Super Cup was a competition organised by the Saudi and Egyptian football federations, between the league and cup champions from each federation. The cup winners from each federation participated in the President el-Sisi's Cup Winners' Super Cup, and the league winners in the King Salman's League Winners' Super Cup. The competition took place only in three seasons: the first in 2001, the second in 2003, and the last in 2018. This cup is considered a friendly tournament and is not taken into consideration when counting the clubs' official trophies.

List of winners

Results by club

See also
 Saudi Arabia Football Federation
 Saudi Premier League
 Egyptian Premier League
 Egyptian Soccer League
 Egyptian Super Cup

References

External links
 Super Cup at goalzz

 
Defunct football competitions in Egypt
Defunct football competitions in Saudi Arabia
Egypt–Saudi Arabia relations